The Chinese women's national ice hockey team represents China at the International Ice Hockey Federation (IIHF) World Women's Championships, the Asian Winter Games, and other international competitions. The women's national team is governed by the Chinese Ice Hockey Association. China's national women's program is ranked twentieth in the world by the IIHF and has 808 active players as of 2020.

History
China reached their hey day of women's hockey in the mid-90s when they finished as high as 4th place mostly thanks to the "Great Wall of China" goaltender, Guo Hong, who is now retired. China had 174 women's ice hockey players in 2011.

Motivated to gain exposure to a more challenging level of competition, the Chinese national team competed in the Naisten SM-sarja, the premier women's league in Finland, for thirteen games in the 2005–06 season and for twelve games in the 2006–07 season.

In 2022, China competed in the 2022 Winter Olympics as the host nation.

Tournament record

Olympic Games

1998 – Finished in 4th place
2002 – Finished in 7th place
2006 – Did not qualify
2010 – Finished in 7th place
2014 – Did not qualify
2018 – Did not qualify
2022 – Finished in 9th place

World Championship
1992 – Finished in 5th place
1994 – Finished in 4th place
1997 – Finished in 4th place
1999 – Finished in 5th place
2000 – Finished in 6th place
2001 – Finished in 6th place
2003 – No result, the competition was cancelled due to SARS epidemic
2004 – Finished in 7th place
2005 – Finished in 6th place
2007 – Finished in 6th place
2008 – Finished in 8th place
2009 – Finished in 9th place (relegated to Division I)
2011 – Finished in 13th place (5th in Division I, relegated to Division IB)
2012 – Finished in 16th place (2nd in Division IB)
2013 – Finished in 18th place (4th in Division IB)
2014 – Finished in 16th place (2nd in Division IB)
2015 – Finished in 17th place (3rd in Division IB)
2016 – Finished in 19th place (5th in Division IB)
2017 – Finished in 18th place (4th in Division IB)
2018 – Finished in 20th place (5th in Division IB)
2019 – Finished in 20th place (4th in Division IB)
2020 – Cancelled due to the COVID-19 pandemic
2021 – Cancelled due to the COVID-19 pandemic
2022 – Finished in 16th place (1st in Division IB, promoted to Division IA)

Asian Games
1996 – 1st 
1999 – 1st 
2003 – 3rd 
2007 – 3rd 
2011 – 3rd 
2017 – 2nd

IIHF Challenge Cup of Asia
2010 – 1st  
2011 – 2nd  
2012 – 2nd  
2014 – 1st

Pacific Rim Championship
1995 – 3rd 
1996 – 3rd

Team

Current roster
The roster for the 2022 IIHF Women's World Championship Division I Group B tournament.

Head coach:  Clayton BeddoesAssistant coach:  Melanie Jue

Notable players
Guo Hong, G
Jin Fengling, F
Liu Hongmei (刘红梅), F
Sun Rui, F
Wang Linuo, F
Yang Xiuqing (杨秀青), F

Individual all-time records

Head coaches
 Yu Zaizhou (199?–1995)
 Yao Naifeng (1995–1999)
 Zhang Zhinan (1999–2000)
 Yao Naifeng (2000–2003)
 Jan Votruba (2003–2004)
 Paul Strople (2004–2005)
 Ryan Stone (2005–2006)
 Jorma Siitarinen (2006–2007)
 Steve Carlyle (2007–2008)
 Paul Strople (2008–2009)
 Hannu Saintula (2009–2011)
 Mikhail Chekanov (2011–2012)
 Wang Jingang (2012)
 Zhang Zhinan (2013)
 Wang Jingang (2013–2015)
 Rick Seeley (2015–2019)
 Brian Idalski (2019–)

All-time record against other nations
Last match update: 11 March 2022

Notables

Matches
First match
20 April 1992: 1992 IIHF Women's World Championship in Tampere, Finland.  8–0 
Largest  victory
28 January 2003: 2003 Asian Winter Games in Misawa, Japan.  30–1 
Largest  defeat
3 April 2001: 2001 Women's World Ice Hockey Championships in Minnesota, United States.  13–0 
Most goals for
28 January 2003: 2003 Asian Winter Games in Misawa, Japan.  30–1 
Most goals against
15 April 1994: 1994 IIHF Women's World Championship in Lake Placid, United States.  14–3 
First shutout for
8 April 1995: 1995 Pacific Rim Championships in San Jose, United States.  5–0 
First shutout against
20 April 1992: 1992 IIHF Women's World Championship in Tampere, Finland.  8–0 
First shutout tie
5 April 2001: 2001 Women's World Ice Hockey Championships in Minneapolis, United States.  0–0 
First win
23 April 1992: 1992 IIHF Women's World Championship in Tampere, Finland.  5–2 
First loss
20 April 1992: 1992 IIHF Women's World Championship in Tampere, Finland.  8–0 
First tie
12 April 1994: 1994 IIHF Women's World Championship in Lake Placid, United States.  4–4 
Highest scoring tie
16 February 2002: 2002 Winter Olympics in Salt Lake City, United States.  5–5 
Lowest scoring tie
5 April 2001: 2001 Women's World Ice Hockey Championships in Minneapolis, United States.  0–0

Rankings
First IIHF World Ranking
7th (2003)
Highest IIHF World Ranking
7th (2005, 2006, 2009, 2010)
Lowest world ranking
13th (2012)
First Olympic qualification attempt
1998 Winter Olympics
First Olympic qualification
1998 Winter Olympics
Best Olympic finish
4th (1998 Winter Olympics)
Worst Olympic finish
Did Not Qualify (2006 Winter Olympics)
First world championship competition
1992
Highest world championship competition finish
4th (1994, 1997)
Lowest world championship competition finish
16th (2012)

References

External links

IIHF profile

 
Ice hockey
Women's national ice hockey teams in Asia
National team